Peter Shalulile (born 23 October 1993) is a Namibian professional footballer who plays as a striker for South African Premier Division side Mamelodi Sundowns and the Namibia national team.

Club career
Peter is a product of Tura Magic FC in Namibia a club he joined when they were campaigning in the NFA Khomas second division and helped gain promotion in the 2011–2012 season. He made his way up from the U-20 to the Senior Namibia National Soccer Team and scored crucial goals en route to their first ever trophy which was the COSAFA Cup in 2015.

He joined Highlands Park who were playing in the South African second tier at the time after an impressive showing at the COSAFA Cup in 2015 and helped them gain promotion. His two crucial goals in the Playoff encounter against Mbombela at the Makhulong Stadium on Wednesday June 15, 2016 sent Highlands Park to the top flight of South African Football.

Midway through the 2019–20 season, the media speculated that Shalulile was being hunted by three of South Africa's biggest clubs, Mamelodi Sundowns, Kaizer Chiefs and Orlando Pirates. This was all down to his mercurial performance in front of the goal. And indeed he finished the season as joint top goalscorer alongside Orlando Pirates' Gabadinho Mhango. At the end of that same 2019–20 season, the player and both Highlands Park F.C and Mamelodi Sundowns F.C confirmed that he has signed for the latter club. He adapted fairly quick as he scored 4 goals in 7 league appearances. Shalulile is the second Namibian player to join Mamelodi Sundowns after Ronnie 'The Magnet' Fillemon Kanalelo, who played for the Brazilians between 1997 and 2005. In his maiden season at Masandawana, Shalulile does not seem to be struggling with proving his worth to the club. His commitment in attack, defence and link up play with his teammates show exactly why Sundowns decided to sign him.

International career
On the international scene Peter has scored 6 goals for the senior national team, the last being in Namibia's 1–0 win over Niger in their Africa Cup of Nations qualifier on 4 June 2016.

He was a member of the Namibian under-19 squad that won the Metropolitan Under-19 Premier Cup in South Africa in 2011.

International goals
As of match played 4 June 2022. Namibia score listed first, score column indicates score after each Shalulile goal.

Honours
 In 2021, he won PSL football of the season award.

 Individual Honours 

 PSL Footballer of the Year:  2020-21
 PSL Top goalscorer: 2020-21
 PSL Footballer of the Season: 2021-22
 PSL Players' Player of the Season: 2021-22
 PSL Top goalscorer: 2021-22

Mamelodi Sundowns

Premier Soccer League
2020-2021
2021-2022

Nedbank Cup
2022

MTN 8
2021

References

External links

1993 births
Living people
Namibian men's footballers
Association football forwards
Tura Magic F.C. players
Highlands Park F.C. players
Mamelodi Sundowns F.C. players
South African Premier Division players
Namibia international footballers
2019 Africa Cup of Nations players
Footballers from Windhoek